Bobby Shaftoe may refer to:

Bobby Shafto, 18th-century English politician and subject of a famous song
Bobby Shafto's Gone to Sea, the song itself
Bobby Shaftoe, a lead character in Neal Stephenson's novel Cryptonomicon
Sergeant Bob Shaftoe, a 17th-century character in Stephenson's The Baroque Cycle, brother of Jack Shaftoe, an ancestor of Bobby Shaftoe

See also
 Robert Shafto (disambiguation)